HMCS Messines was one of twelve  naval trawlers constructed for and used by the Royal Canadian Navy (RCN) during the First World War. Following the war the ship was transferred to the Canadian Department of Marine and Fisheries and converted into a lightvessel. Re-designated Lightship No. 3, the vessel was sold for scrap and broken up in 1962.

Design and description
The RCN's Battle-class trawlers formed part of the Canadian naval response to Admiralty warnings to Canada about the growing German U-boat threat to merchant shipping in the western Atlantic. Intended to augment anti-submarine patrols off Canada's east coast, these ships were modelled on contemporary British North Sea trawlers, since the standard types of Canadian fishing vessels were considered unsuitable for patrol work.

Twelve vessels were ordered on 2 February 1917 from two shipyards, Polson Iron Works of Toronto and Canadian Vickers of Montreal.

All twelve trawlers were equipped with a QF 12-pounder 12 cwt naval gun mounted forward. This was considered to be the smallest gun that stood a chance of putting a surfaced U-boat out of action, and they also carried a small number of depth charges. The trawlers were named after battles of the Western Front during the First World War that Canadians had been involved in. They cost between $155,000 and $160,000 per vessel.

Service history
Named after the Battle of Messines, the trawler was built by Polson Iron Works at Toronto, Ontario and launched on 16 June 1917. Intended for use during the 1917 shipping season, the construction of the vessels was delayed by the entry of the United States into the war. With higher wages found south of the border, a shortage of skilled labour developed in the shipyards, coupled with a shortage of construction material. Messines was commissioned on 13 November 1917.

Messines sailed to the east coast where for the 1918 shipping season, all the Battle-class trawlers were assigned to patrol and escort duties based out of Sydney, Nova Scotia. The vessel performed these duties until the end of the war. The ship remained in service with the RCN until 1920 when Messines was paid off.

This involved the installation of an electric light placed at the foremast head and a foghorn situated on a latticework tower. Messines was re-designated Lightship No. 3 and served as such until being sold for scrap and broken up in 1962.

References

Notes

Citations

Sources

External links
 Battle-class trawlers

 

Battle-class trawlers
World War I naval ships of Canada
1917 ships
Auxiliary ships of the Royal Canadian Navy